Alexander Klyachin is a Russian entrepreneur and investor. According to Forbes, as of April 2021, his fortune is estimated at $1,600 million in 2020, making him the 60th richest businessperson in Russia. He is the Head of the investment company Gleden Invest. Also, he is the founder of the international hotel chain Azimut Hotels and the owner of the fashionable Metropol Hotel near the Moscow Kremlin. Alexander is a large commercial real estate developer, and the owner of KR Properties and the Karat cheese factory in Moscow. Mass media allege him of being a major corporate raider, getting hold on plots of land by using complicated juridical schemes. Novye Izvestia newspaper in 2021 published a report disclosing one of the scheme involving land where Russian business centre of Swedish Ikea company resides for decades.

Biography 
Klyachin was born in Moscow on May 18, 1967. In 1984, he finished Moscow School 57, well-known for a large number of outstanding graduates. In 1991, he graduated from the Geography Department of Moscow State University. Alexander also graduated from Oregon State University in the USA in 1993, majoring in geography as well.   

In 1993, he worked in the finance field. In the early 2000s, he began working in the real estate industry, acquiring land plots in Moscow and the Moscow region. His company KR Properties redeveloped former industrial zones into modern business districts.

In 2006, he founded Azimut Hotels. It began with the reconstruction of old hotels and buildings of the Soviet era in Russian cities. In 2008, Azimut Hotels became the first Russian hotel chain to enter the European market (Austria and Germany). The company currently manages more than 50 hotels in Russia, Europe, and Israel.

In 2012, Alexander Klyachin became the owner of the historic Metropol hotel near the Moscow Kremlin.

In 2021, Klyachin's company Gleden Invest signed a memorandum with the state corporation VEB on cooperation within a wide pool of tourism cluster development projects in Siberia, the Far East and the North Caucasus. Currently, Klyachin is signing agreements with several heads of Russian regions (Yaroslavl, Kemerovo, Samara regions, etc.) on the construction and development of industrial and tourist facilities. Among the largest projects is the development of the Sheregesh ski resort in Gornaya Shoria (Siberia).

Alexander has also invested in the oil industry, high technology field, and in restaurant business.

Klyachin is the founder of the Khamovniki charity foundation for the support of social research.

In 2012, Alexander Klyachin joined the Bolshoi Theater Board of Trustees.

In 2021, Klyachin has been appointed board chairman of Moscow’s Jewish Museum and Tolerance Center.

References

External links 
 Klyachin's English profile at Forbes

Russian businesspeople in real estate
1967 births
Living people
Russian Jews
Hoteliers
Businesspeople from Moscow